Jian or Jiyan may refer to:
 Jian, Kharameh
 Jian, Sepidan